Stevan "Stefan" Selaković (born 9 January 1977) is a Swedish former professional footballer who played  as a midfielder and forward. He used to play as forward, but after 2006 was primarily used as a rightwing midfielder by IFK Göteborg. He previously played for SC Heerenveen, Halmstads BK and Varbergs GIF. He is a former Swedish international for which he played in 12 games and scored 4 goals.

Career
He was born in Varberg, with roots from Serbia. After playing for Varbergs GIF, he joined Halmstads BK and won Allsvenskan in 2000 and was the top scorer in Allsvenskan in 2001. He then joined Dutch club SC Heerenveen. He was not able to continue to play as well as he had done in Sweden, and in 2005 he decided to move back to Sweden. Instead of his earlier club Halmstads BK he chose to play for IFK Göteborg and signed a contract in 2005.

On 23 January 2013, Halmstads BK reported that Selaković had returned to the club.

Career statistics

International 
Scores and results list Sweden's goal tally first, score column indicates score after each Selaković goal.

References

External links
 
 

1977 births
Living people
People from Varberg
Swedish footballers
Association football forwards
Association football midfielders
Sweden international footballers
Allsvenskan players
Eredivisie players
Halmstads BK players
IFK Göteborg players
SC Heerenveen players
Swedish expatriate footballers
Swedish expatriate sportspeople in the Netherlands
Expatriate footballers in the Netherlands
Swedish people of Serbian descent
Serb diaspora sportspeople
Sportspeople from Halland County